Peter James Sanguesa Cooper is a film producer and businessman.

Entertainment
Cooper produced the independent romantic comedy film, Love and Mary, starring Lauren German and Gabriel Mann.  The film was written and directed for the screen by Elizabeth Harrison, and filmed entirely in Houston, Texas.  Love and Mary premiered at the South by Southwest film festival in Austin, Texas on March 11, 2007.  It was also featured at the Hollywood Film Festival on October 19, 2007.

He is also the executive producer of the independent feature film This Is What Remains, written and directed by Ben Wagner.  This Is What Remains is a psychological thriller produced by 3:41am Productions.  The film has been acquired by Millennium Entertainment for U.S. domestic distribution.

Business
Cooper is the co-founder of Crave Cupcakes in Houston, Texas. Crave Cupcakes is a gourmet cupcake bakery designed by the design firm AvroKO of New York City. Cooper created the Crave brand name and the vintage mixer logo identity, as well as having a hand in the overall design of the bakery concept.

References

External links
 
 Love and Mary Trailer
 Crave Cupcakes

American film producers
Living people
Place of birth missing (living people)
Year of birth missing (living people)